Gem TV or Gems TV may refer to:

 GEM TV, a Turkey-based group of Persian-language satellite television channels
 GEM TV, former name of DZCE-TV a.k.a. INC TV, a Philippine TV station
 Gem (Southeast Asia TV channel), a Southeast Asian cable and satellite television channel available in various Asian countries and owned by KC Global Media
 GEM TV, former name of Christian Era Broadcasting Service International from 2005 to 2012
 Gems TV, a jewellery shopping network headquartered in Thailand, first launched in the UK and expanded to other countries
 Gems TV (UK), launched 2004
 Gems TV Extra, UK, on air 2011–2012
 Gems TV (USA), on air 2006–2010
 Gems TV (German TV channel), on air October–December 2012
 9Gem, an Australian television channel formerly named GEM

See also
 Gem (disambiguation)
 Gems (TV series), a British soap opera on air 1985–1988